Augustine Olatunji Olobia (born 18 July 1969) is a Nigerian sprinter. He competed in the men's 4 × 100 metres relay at the 1988 Summer Olympics.

References

External links
 

1969 births
Living people
Athletes (track and field) at the 1988 Summer Olympics
Nigerian male sprinters
Olympic athletes of Nigeria
Place of birth missing (living people)